Shim is a hard rock band fronted by former Sick Puppies lead vocalist Shimon Moore. The band formed after Moore's departure from Sick Puppies which he fronted from 1997-2014. On May 16, 2018, the band released their debut single "Hallelujah". Following the single, they made a debut performance at Rock on the Range on May 20, 2018. On September 14, 2018, the band released their eponymous debut album, SHIM. Moore described the record as "definitely a solo record" when interviewed by Loudwire stating that most of the material was produced in his bedroom. On April 9, 2020 Shim had his first stream on Twitch as the Hollywood Rebellion.

Discography

Studio albums

Singles

Music videos

References 

Australian hard rock musical groups